Lindsay Davenport and Martina Hingis were the defending champions, but only Davenport competed that year with Natasha Zvereva.

Davenport and Zvereva won in the final 6–4, 6–4 against Larisa Neiland and Elena Tatarkova.

Seeds
Champion seeds are indicated in bold text while text in italics indicates the round in which those seeds were eliminated.

 Lindsay Davenport /  Natasha Zvereva (champions)
 Elena Likhovtseva /  Ai Sugiyama (first round)
 Debbie Graham /  Caroline Vis (semifinals)
 Larisa Neiland /  Elena Tatarkova (final)

Draw

External links
 1998 Bank of the West Classic Doubles draw

Silicon Valley Classic
1998 WTA Tour